The Wesleyan Holiness Church, also known as the Wesleyan Holiness Association of Churches, is a Methodist Christian denomination in the conservative holiness movement. It has congregations throughout Canada, the United States and missions in other parts of the world.

History 
The formation of the Wesleyan Holiness Church is a part of the history of Methodism in the United States and Canada; it sits within the Holiness movement which emerged in Methodism during the nineteenth century. The church is a schism from the Bible Missionary Church that happened in 1959, the result of perceived overly-lenient views on divorce and remarriage within that group. Congregations that belong to the Wesleyan Holiness Association of Churches joined it, such as that in Portage, which held its first service of worship was held on 18 March 1956.

General Conference, Annual conferences and Camp meetings 
The Wesleyan Holiness Association of Churches holds a General Conference.

The Central District of Wesleyan Holiness Association of Churches holds its annual conference and camp meeting at the Orleans Wesleyan Campgrounds in Orleans, Indiana.

The Northeast District of Wesleyan Holiness Association of Churches holds its annual conference and camp meeting at the Orleans Wesleyan Campgrounds in Clinton, Pennsylvania.

Publications  
The official organ of the Wesleyan Association of Churches is the Eleventh Hour Messenger.

United Kingdom 

In the UK, the British Isles District has 16 churches. The head office is at New Life Wesleyan Church in Handsworth, Birmingham. This District is associated with the Wesleyan Church and not the same as the denomination which left the Bible Missionary Church.

References

External links
 http://www.wesleyanchurch.co.uk  (Official website)
 http://www.wesleyan.net/churches/uk/  (Unofficial website)

Methodist denominations
Christian denominations established in the 20th century
Holiness denominations
Evangelical denominations in North America